Viper is a 2001 Italian drama film directed by Sergio Citti.

Premise
Sicily between the end of World War II and the fifties. Vipera (Elide Melli) is the wife of a sicilian smithy. She meets a man who shows her that life can be better and she promptly leaves her husband and young daughter.

Cast
 Harvey Keitel (dubbed by Giancarlo Giannini) as Leone
 Elide Melli as Vipera 
 Giancarlo Giannini as Guastamacchia
 Larissa Volpentesta as Young Rosetta
 Annalisa Schettino as Adult Rosetta
 Rosario Ainnusa as Fortunato
 Paolo Pini as Luca
 Maurizio Nicolosi as Maniscalpo
 Ante Novakovic as Fascist Soldier

References

External links

2001 films
Italian drama films
Films directed by Sergio Citti
2001 drama films
Films with screenplays by Vincenzo Cerami
Films scored by Nicola Piovani
2000s Italian films